Celestine is the sixth studio album of TV host-singer and actress, Toni Gonzaga, under Star Records released on May 20, 2014 in the Philippines in Digital format and on May 29 for physical release. The album's original release was scheduled in November 2013 but delayed due to many demands of her other projects including the completion of her most grossing film, Starting Over Again, her sitcom Home Sweetie Home, and her reality show The Voice of the Philippines. This is her first album to be released in four years after All Me in 2010.

Gonzaga claimed that Celestine is her most personal and best album keeping it with easy to relate tracks. Further, on October 3, 2014 was the announced concert date which part of promotional tool to support the album. The concert was extended on January 16, 2015 where in she performed at Waterfront Cebu City Hotel.

It was certified gold record by PARI in January 2015. As of August 2018, the album sold 18,000 units and 8,000 were pure sales.

Background
After being hailed as 2011 Female Concert Performer by the Guillermo Mendoza Memorial Foundation, multimedia star Gonzaga herself revealed that she is already working on her next (sixth) album.

“There are definitely plans for the album, for my sixth studio album under Star Records so sana abangan din ng ating mga kababayan iyon,” she said in an interview with ABS-CBN News after the awards night. Gonzaga also said that she would love to hold more concerts in the future. “I pray na sana talagang magsunud-sunod pa siya at marami pa akong magawang concert na maibigay sa mga manonood,” she added.

The supposed recording sessions for the album was delayed for couple of times which hold the released of the project. But after the success of her most grossing film, Starting Over Again, as well in all time Filipino films excluding MMFF entries, and in the overseas screening, the album was finally scheduled to be released sometime in summer. Star Records announced the release date and album title on May 14 through their Facebook account which reposted and retweeted by Gonzaga for her fans on the following day.

Gonzaga confirmed Starting Over Again as one of the six tracks. The LP consists 10 tracks with 7 original songs including Gonzaga's rendition of the said song above, Himig Handog entry Kahit Na, and Gonzaga's own compositions Awit Ni Ginny and This Love Is Like.
During the presscon held at Wheatberry Bakery and Café, she said that the album is very special to her. “It is very personal to my heart. My real name Celestine means heavenly. I believe that this album is a gift from heaven. It took a while for us to finish it because of the schedule. Our target was October last year, but I was also doing a movie at that time so we needed to wait, but God's timing is always perfect. This is the Best album I’ve done” she added.

Production
The title of the album was originally the idea of Jonathan Manalo, the album-producer, and at certain he researched the meaning of Celestine which an angel who killed most numbers of demons in ancient times. This album shows the creativity and passion of Gonzaga as an all-around Artist. In writing songs, she was able to produce two. The title of the single "This Love Is Like", originally Walkin’ On Air, was changed due to the same song title released from Katy Perry's Prism. She claimed that "This Love Is Like" was an old record track of her before the latter. 
Gonzaga wrote Awit Ni Ginny (Song of Ginny) as the second lead single of the album. The song was originally called "Himlay" (Slumber), but Anthony Taberna of Umagang Kay Ganda cited that the title track was like a description of a funeral. The song title was suggested by her producer, Jonathan Manalo, he commented, “Since you played the role of Ginny in the film, why we don't use it.” During the writing session, Toni was motivated by Olivia Lamasan, her director of Starting Over Again,  and pushed herself to pour emotion to the song. The song was the most worked compared to the rest in the album. Jonathan noted, “we have 24 layers of harmonies for the song but if you try to listen (to the song), (it has) rich texture of vocal parts done by Toni.” Tony thinks that the arrangement of Starting Over Again by Manalo was great which make her excited to record it.

Promotion
The album was first promoted on May 25 during her interview in The Buzz by Boy Abunda. After the album launch on June 8 in ASAP, Star Records started to support the album tour at the Eastwood open park on June 22 and ended at SM Fairview Atrium on August 9. Toni performed some of her songs on June 21 and 28 during the PBB Eviction night. 9 dates of mall tours are held nationwide after telecast. Gonzaga guested in Umagang Kay Ganda, DZMM Radyo Patrol 630, MOR 101.9 My Only Radio For Life!, Mornings @ ANC and attended a press conference on 10 June. Extending her rise as MYX Celebrity VJ for the month of July, and a guest performer in MYX Live!. October 3, 2014 is the date announced by Gonzaga herself from her Facebook account for her fifth major concert after her Toni@10: Anniversary Concert in 2011. This concert entitled, Celestine Toni Gonzaga.

Awards and certifications
Celestine was certified gold record in January 2015, after nine months since it was released. Same year in November, the album won an award at the 7th PMPC Star Awards for Music for the category of Album Of The Year.

Singles
"Kahit Na" was released on January 7, 2013. Written by, Bojam De Belen, the original version was interpreted by Gonzaga as a song entry for the Himig Handog 2013 and finished in fifth place. The remix version featured in the album has a different arrangement. Its music video were produced and directed by the students of University of the Philippines. The song was an early favorite during the live airing of it both in television and radios that cause it to enter in top 10 of most airplay charts in the Philippines. The strong rotation of airplay got heavier when the music video was released on the 2 February, premiered in Myx. It peaked at number 5 in Myx Hit Chart. Furthermore, it also debuted at number 24 and peaked at number 18 in the March 2013 issue of Philippines Top 40 Hit Singles, making it the second most successful entry in the competition in terms of airplay behind Daniel Padilla's Nasa Iyo Na Ang Lahat.

This Love Is Like and Awit Ni Ginny were simultaneously released on May 27, 2014 as the second and third single of the album. The singles were first premiered in MOR101.9 station on that date. Both tracks were written by Gonzaga. The music video of the first lead single premiered on July 29 at exactly 8:00pm. It was conceptualized as like pass access of her off-cam or behind the scene of her everyday activity. The single debuted at number one in the August 10–16 issue of MYX Hit Chart. This marked as Toni's third chart-topping single since Catch Me I'm Fallin''' in 2007. The further success of the single extended in US and Canada through the inclusion of it on the list of SiriusXM radio station.Finally'' was released as the final single of the album, on June 12, 2015.

Track listing

Personnel
 Malou N. Santos – executive producer
 Roxy Liquigan – executive producer
 Jonathan Manalo – over all album producer
 Marivic Benedicto – star song, inc. and new media head
 Regie Sandal – sales and distribution head
 Darwin P. Chiang – OIC star receptionist
 Jayson E. Sarmiento – Promo Specialist
 Beth Faustino – music publishing officer
 Eaizen Almazan – new media technical assistant
 Abbey Aledo – music servicing officer
 Andrew Castillo – creative head for design and layout
 Lalic Lansang – additional photo rendering head
 Julienne Christine Adriano – additional photo rendering head 
 Xander Angeles – photographer
 Krist Bansuelo – hair dresser and make-up artist
 AJ Alberto – Stylist
 Dante Tanedo – album mixer

Certifications

Release history

References

2014 albums
Toni Gonzaga albums
Star Music albums